"Sentinel" is a single by musician Mike Oldfield, released in 1992. The single features a restructured, shorter version of "Sentinel", from the album Tubular Bells II. The piece itself is a re-imagining of the introduction theme from Oldfield's 1973 album Tubular Bells which was known for its use in The Exorcist film.

Charts
It charted at number 10 in the UK Singles Chart and at number 14 in the Irish Singles Chart.

Usage
An excerpt was used in the soundtrack for the "Back from the Dead" television programme, broadcast by the BBC in 2010 as part of its Horizon series of documentaries
The piece is featured on a Pavarotti & Friends CD from Luciano Pavarotti's International Charity Gala Concert in Modena on 27 September 1992
The series Baywatch used the song on its episode "The Tower"

Track listing

UK single
 "Sentinel" (Single Restructure) (Mike Oldfield) – 3:57
 "Sentinel" (the orb 7" mix) – 4:07
 "Early Stages" – 4:08

UK promo single
 "Sentinel-Restructure" (Satoshi Tomiie Interpretation) – 7:41
 "Sentinel-Restructure" (Global Lust Mix) – 5:55
 "Sentinel-Restructure" (Trance Mix) – 5:52
 "Sentinel-Restructure" (Tubular Beats) – 4:12

Oldfield versus The Orb

"Sentinel" was also released as a remix single, credited to Oldfield versus The Orb. It was released on September 28, 1992.

"Sentinel Total Overhaul" track listing 
 "Sentinel" (nobel prize mix) – 14:26
 "Sentinel" (orbular bells mix) – 12:26
 "Sentinel" (the orb 7" mix) – 4:03

References
 

1992 singles
Mike Oldfield songs
Song recordings produced by Tom Newman (musician)
Songs written by Mike Oldfield
Song recordings produced by Trevor Horn
Warner Music Group singles
1992 songs